The Mozambique women's national under-16 basketball team represents Mozambique in international basketball matches and is controlled by the Federação Moçambicana de Basquetebol. At continental level, it competes at the FIBA Africa Under-16 Championship. Mozambique has been a member of FIBA since 1978.

Performance at FIBA AfroBasket

Last Roster

International Competitions 
Mozambique has never qualified to the Olympic Games and FIBA Under-17 Basketball World Cup.

References

External links
Profile - Mozambique, FIBA.com Retrieved 2018-01-15

Women's national under-16 basketball teams
B